Major General Andrew Michael Roe,  is a senior British Army officer who currently serves as Chief Executive and Commandant of the Defence Academy of the United Kingdom.

Military career
Roe was commissioned into the Green Howards in April 1992. He became commanding officer of the 2nd Battalion, the Yorkshire Regiment, in April 2011. He went on to be commander 38 (Irish) Brigade in August 2015, Assistant Commandant (Land) of the Joint Services Command and Staff College in August 2017 and Commandant of the Joint Services Command and Staff College in May 2019.

Roe was awarded a Queen's Commendation for Valuable Service in September 2010 for distinguished service in Afghanistan, and appointed a Companion of the Order of the Bath in the 2022 Birthday Honours.

Selected publications

Books

Articles

References

 

British Army major generals
Companions of the Order of the Bath
Green Howards officers
Living people
Recipients of the Commendation for Valuable Service
Year of birth missing (living people)
British military personnel of The Troubles (Northern Ireland)
Military personnel of the Bosnian War
British Army personnel of the War in Afghanistan (2001–2021)
British Army personnel of the Iraq War